Newton Brandburn Pittman (born August 29, 1976) is an American voice actor working for Funimation, best known for playing Gray Fullbuster in Fairy Tail, Zwei in Phantom ~Requiem for the Phantom, and Panties in Eden of the East. Pittman lived in New York City for eight years, before returning to the Dallas-Fort Worth Metroplex area.

Outside of voice acting, he is also a composer and singer, having written some original music in his spare time.

Filmography

Film

Television

Video Game

References

External links
 Newton Pittman at Myspace
 
 

1976 births
Living people
American male voice actors
Male actors from New York (state)
Male actors from Texas